The MASCAC men's basketball tournament is the annual conference basketball championship tournament for the NCAA Division III Massachusetts State Collegiate Athletic Conference. The tournament has been held annually since 1990. It is a single-elimination tournament and seeding is based on regular season records.

As conference champion, the winner receives the MASCAC's automatic bid to the NCAA Men's Division III Basketball Championship.

Results

Finals champion only
Championship game results incomplete, 1990–2003

Full results

Championship records
Results incomplete for 1990–2003

References

NCAA Division III men's basketball conference tournaments
Basketball Tournament, Men's
Recurring sporting events established in 1990